Alexander Weidinger (born 18 June 1997) is a German professional footballer who plays as a goalkeeper for Jahn Regensburg. For half a season he was loaned to SpVgg Unterhaching.

References

External links
 

1997 births
Living people
Footballers from Bavaria
German footballers
Association football goalkeepers
2. Bundesliga players
Regionalliga players
SSV Jahn Regensburg players
SSV Jahn Regensburg II players
SpVgg Unterhaching players